Østbyen is a borough of the city of Trondheim in Trøndelag county, Norway. The borough was established on 1 January 2005 in a municipal borough reform that reduced the number of boroughs in the city.  The borough of Lerkendal lies to the southwest, Midtbyen lies to the northwest, and the municipality of Malvik lies to the east.  Trondheimsfjorden lies to the north.  The borough consists of the areas of Møllenberg, Nedre Elvehavn, Rosenborg, Lade, Strindheim, Brundalen, Charlottenlund, Jakobsli, Ranheim and Vikåsen.  It has 39,171 residents.

See also
List of boroughs in Trondheim prior to 2005

References

External links
Map of the boroughs of Trondheim 

Geography of Trondheim